Shamau Shareef ( ޝަމާޢު ޝަރީފް) is a Maldivian politician who is a Deputy Minister of Health. Previously he served at Malé City Council as the 4th Deputy Mayor from 2017 till 2021, He was elected to the council to represent Maafannu Hulhangu Constituency in 2014. He represents the Maldivian Democratic Party, and is also Vice Chair of the party's Rights Committee.

Career
Prior to Shamau's political affiliation, he was the founder and President of Youth For Equality (an NGO) and director of Sanco Maldives Pvt. Ltd, a family owned business specializing in maritime operation.

After joining the Maldivian Democratic Party, Shamau participated in many campaigns and canvassed in different areas of the country. Shamau was the Deputy Coordinator for Malé City during the 2013 Presidential Elections campaign for MDP candidate President Mohamed Nasheed. He stood for office in the February 2014 local council elections and was elected to Malé City Council. Shamau also represented at the second Board of Local Government Authority of Maldives.

References

External links
 https://web.archive.org/web/20151117022703/http://www.adb.org/sites/default/files/city-delegate-profiles.pdf 
 http://lga.gov.mv/news/22
 http://www.malecity.gov.mv/
https://mdp.org.mv/archives/elected-officials/shamau-shareef?lang=en/
https://presidency.gov.mv/Government/Officials/141

Maldivian Democratic Party politicians
People from Malé
1983 births
Living people